Tom Van Landuyt (born 7 May 1967) is a Belgian actor and singer probably best known for his role as Tom Smits in the Belgian drama film Ad Fundum. He has also starred in numerous Flemish movies, Television series and on stage. In 2002, he married the Dutch actress Angela Schijf.

Early life 
Van Landuyt was born in Leuven, Belgium. He was in training for actor at the Hoger Instituut voor Dramatische Kunsten (HIDK – Studio Herman Teirlinck) in Antwerp, where he graduated with honors in 1992.

Career 
In 1992, he starred as a leading actor in the film Ad Fundum, for which he also recorded four songs for the motion picture soundtrack, including a duet with the English female singer-songwriter Sam Brown.

In 1995, he played his first Shakespeare at the KNS (Koninklijke Nederlandse Schouwburg, the Royal Theatre Company in Antwerp) and released his first solo album Pig Party (songwriter, performer, and producer).

From 1997 till 2000 he was part of the NTG (Nedelands Toneel Gent, the Royal Theatre Company in Ghent), where he played leading roles in A Clockwork Orange, A Midsummer Night's Dream, Peter Pan, Spring Awakening, etc.

In 2000 and 2001 he worked with the Belgian theatre director Ivo van Hove, in a production (Rent) of the Dutch theatrical producer Joop van den Ende in Amsterdam.

In 2009, he wrote, performed, and produced a Dutch album called Man Zo Nu En Dan. That same year he produced and directed the music video "Blanke Maagd" and "Vrijheid".

In 2013, he founded the theatre company Naastdeburen with his wife, Dutch actress Angela Schijf.

In 2015 he produced his first play Kreutzersonate, Als het verlangen maar stopt, an adaptation of the novel of the Russian writer Leo Tolstoy. The play was a co-production with t,arsenaal Mechelen.

Filmography

Theatre 
 Twelfth Night (Driekoningenavond, Koninklijke Nederlandse Schouwburg, KNS 1995)
 Sacco and Vanzetti (KBvV, musical, 1996)
 Gelukkige Verjaardag Jelena! (Koninklijk Jeugd Theater, KJT, 1997)
 A Midsummer Night's Dream (NTG, 1997)
 Spring Awakening, NTG, 1998)
 Le Bal (NTG, 1998)
 A Clockwork Orange (NTG, 1998)
 Macbeth (Lennox, NTG,1999)
 Peter Pan (NTG, 1999)
 Fun (Nederlands Toneel Gent – NTG, 2000)
 Rent (Joop van de Ende Theaterproducties, musical, 2000)
 Tintin (Kuifje, Tabas & Co, 2001)
 A Midsummer Night's Dream (De Paardenkathedraal Utrecht, 2007)
 Hannibal (t,arsenaal mechelen, 2013 )
 Amigos (t,arsenaal mechelen, 2014)
 Kreutzersonate, Als het verlangen maar stopt (Also co-writer and producer, adaptation of the novel The Kreutzer Sonata (Leo Tolstoy), naastdeburen – t,arsenaal mechelen, 2015–2016)
Drarrie in de nacht, Jr.cE.sA.r (Junior Mthombeni, Cesar Janssens, Fikry El Azzouzi / KVS 2019)
Wij de Verdronkenen (Walpurgis, Theater aan Zee (TAZ) 2021)

Voice-over career 
Flemish voice
 Dinosaur (Buena Vista Disney, 2000)
 Titan after Earth (20th Century Fox, 2000)
 Spy Kids (2001)
 Six Flags Batman Show (2001)
 Lego big nana bird (2001)
 Barbie in the Nutcracker (Mattel, 2001)
 The Lion of Oz (2001)
 Spy Kids (Disney, 2002)
 Cats & Dogs (Warner Bros, 2002)
 Powerpuff Girls (Warner Bros, 2002)
 Scooby-Doo 1 (Warner Bros, 2002)
 The Road to El Dorado (DreamWorks – Spielberg, 2000)
 Looney tunes, back in action (Warner Bros, 2003)
 Home on the range, Paniek op de prairie (Disney, 2003)
 Sinbad, Legend of the Seven Seas (DreamWorks – Spielberg, 2003)
 Alvin and the chipmunks 2 (20th Century Fox, 2009)
 Het lelijke eendje (2005)
 Pitt & Kantrop (BBC/VRT, 2005)
 Cars (Disney Pixar, 2006)
 Bratz (2006)
 Brother Bear (Walt Disney Studios, 1998)
 The Prince of Egypt, De Prins van Egypte (DreamWorks – Spielberg, 1998)
 De Sprookjesverteller (2009)
 Beverly Hills Chihuahua 1 (Disney, 2009)
 Planet 51 (2010)
 Moeders Mooiste (2010)
 Beverly Hills Chihuahua 2 (Disney, 2010)
 Cats en dogs (De wraak van Kitty Galore, Warner Bros, 2010)
 Tad, the lost explorer (Op zoek naar de verloren stad, 2012)
 Beverly Hills Chihuahua 3 (Viva la Fiesta, Disney, 2012)
 Belle et Sébastian (Nicolas Vanier, 2013)

Discography 
 Ad Fundum (Motion Picture Soundtrack Ad Fundum, Standing in my light (feat. Sam Brown, writer, composer of the songs Come Home, Fly Away, Pig Party)
 Alles Leeft (Johan Verminnen live, 1994)
 Pig Party (writer, composer, producer of the songs Time, Solitude, It's Alright, Little Figure, Pig Party, Brother, What's about it 1, A Lie, Let's Go For Love, We Talk of Love, You've Got Me, Devils' Woman, Late September, What About It 2, 1995)
 Together (Windkracht 10, 1997)
 Sometimes love just ain't enough (duet with Barbara Dex, 1998)
 Hope Band (1998)
 Help Kosovo (1999)
 Rent (2000)
 Kuifje (2001)
 I won't let you go (writer, composer, producer, Ik laat je niet alleen, 2003)
 Blanke Maagd (writer, composer, producer, 2008)
 Man Zo Nu en Dan (writer, composer, producer of the songs Nu, Wandelende Mens, MeisjeMeisje, Herboren, Blanke Maagd, Minimens, Vrij, Bevrijd Me, Hier, Iedereen Verliefd, Gek, Vrijheid, 2009)
 Amigos (Verre Vrienden,2013)

Producing career 
 Pig Party (music album, 1995)
 Blanke Maagd (also director, music video, 2009)
 Vrijheid (also director, music video, 2009)
 Kreutzersonate, Als het verlangen maar stopt (also director of the trailer, 2014 and 2016)
 Kreutzersonate, Als het verlangen maar stopt (theatre play, 2015–2016)
 Secret Face (director, producer of the trailer, 2016)

Presenter 
At VRT
 Ad Fundum (Studio Brussel, 1992)
 Brieven Uit De Wereld (Studio Brussel, Yogyakarta, Java, Indonesia, 1997)
 Vlaanderen Vakantieland  (BRTN, 1 episode, 1997)
 Quix (VRT, 2001)
 Vox Pop (VRT, 2004)

At VT4
 O.I.N.C. (1995, news and culture)
 Kickx (1996, action and adventure)
 Het Vuur van Wadi Rum (1999, adventure, Wadi Rum, Jordan)

References

External links 
 

1967 births
Living people
Belgian male actors
Belgian male singers
Belgian television presenters
Belgian voice actors